The UNIX-HATERS Handbook is a semi-humorous edited compilation of messages to the UNIX-HATERS mailing list. The book was edited by Simson Garfinkel, Daniel Weise and Steven Strassmann and published in 1994.

Contents 

The book concerns the frustrations of users of the Unix operating system. Many users had come from systems that they felt were far more sophisticated in features and usability, and they were frustrated by the perceived "worse is better" design philosophy that they felt Unix and much of its software encapsulated.

The book is based on messages sent to the UNIX-HATERS mailing list between 1988 and 1993, and contains a foreword by the human factors guru Don Norman and an "anti-foreword" by Dennis Ritchie, one of the creators of the operating system.

Many of the book's complaints about the Unix operating system are based on design decisions and anomalies in the command-line interface.

The front-matter page's dedication says: "To Ken and Dennis, without whom this book would not have been possible.", referring to Ken Thompson and Dennis Ritchie, the creators of Unix.

Release 

This book was printed as a trade paperback. Its front cover was designed to be similar to The Scream. An air sickness bag, printed with the phrase "UNIX barf bag", was inserted into the inside back cover of every copy by the publisher.

The book was made available to download for free in electronic format in 2003.

Reception 

Later reviewers of the book have noted that some issues were resolved in the future, such as the development of the ext2 filesystem addressing the discussed lack of block storage.

References

External links 

 

Unix history
1994 non-fiction books
Operating system criticisms
Unix books
Comedy books